Jagar (Devanagari: जागर) is a Hindu shamanic form of Shamanism which is practiced in the hills of Uttarakhand, both in Garhwal and Kumaon. As a ritual, Jagar is a way in which gods and local deities are woken from their dormant stage and asked for favors or remedies. The ritual is connected to the idea of divine justice and is practiced to seek penance for a crime or to seek justice from the gods for some injustice. The word Jagar comes from the Sanskrit root, Jaga, meaning "to wake".

Music is the medium through which the gods are invoked. The singer, or Jagariya, sings a ballad of the gods with allusions to great epics, such as the Mahabharata or Ramayana, in which the adventures and exploits of the god being invoked are described. After evolving over time, Jagar singing has transformed into an art form that is greatly cherished, the exponents of which are often heralded as living heritage.

These traditions are part of Folk Hinduism, which has co-existed alongside mainstream Hinduism and is prevalent across the Himalayas. The hard life within the Himalayas and constant exposure to the vagaries of nature inspired a strong belief in paranormal phenomena and in numerous folk gods, who were given great reverence and respect. Every village had its own god, called Bhumyal or Kshetrapal, protecting its boundaries. Each family has its own Kul Devta or Kul Devi. In addition, there were numerous other benevolent demigods and goddesses that could reward people, as well as malicious spirits that could torment people. These practices are similar to shamanistic traditions prevalent in ancient rites around the world. While most of these deities have been lost or incorporated into monotheistic practices, Hinduism has strong kuladevata traditions that enabled the Jagar tradition to grow in India and Nepal. In particular, the isolation of the Kumaon and Garhwal due to the Himalayas promoted the emergence of local religious traditions, which are still strong in these regions along with mainstream Hinduism.

Jagar ceremonies generally have three primary types. The first is the Dev Jagar, or the invocation of a god, which usually includes local gods occupying the body of the medium. The second is the Bhut Jagar, or the invocation of a deceased person's spirit or soul in the medium's body. Other less frequently practiced forms include the Masan Puja.

Today, Jagar is viewed as a cultural and musical component of local heritage that needs preservation. The ritual remains highly revered, especially in rural areas and New Delhi. Since many Kumauni and Gadwali live in Delhi and are unable go to villages every year for Jagar, they have initiated Jagar in Delhi.

Participants

Jagariya
The Jagariya (जगरिया) is the singer of the ballads of the gods who leads the rituals and invokes the gods by calling upon them. The Jagariya is assisted by two or more men who sing along with him in chorus.

Dangariya
The Dangariya (डगरिया) is the Shaman, whose body is used by the gods when they incarnate. The word Dangariya comes from the Kumaoni word Dangar, which means way. The Dangariya is the one who shows the way for the gods.

Syonkar
The Syonkar (स्योंकर) is the person who has organized the Jagar to seek divine intervention to his problems. The Jagar is held at the Syonkar's home.

Duration
The Jagar can be organised for
 one day- "Dishunsi" (दिशूंसि)
 three days—Dhinali (धिनाली)
 eleven days
 twenty-two days—Baisi (बैसी)

Preparations
The room in which the Jagar is to be performed is purified by processes closely administered by the Jagar singer, or Jagariya.

The Dhuni (धुनी), or sacred fire, is lit for the Homa.

Instruments
The musical instruments used are the Hurka (हुड़का),damaru or doonr(डोंर), Dhol (ढोल), Damau (दमाऊ), and Thali (थाली), all of which are percussion instruments native to Uttarakhand played by professional musicians.

Rituals

Sanjhwali Geet
In Sanjhvali Geet (साँझवली गीत), all gods are remembered, their names are repeated, and they are asked for assistance for a successful completion of the Jagar.

The following text is an excerpt from the Sanjhvali Geet of deity Gangnath (in Kumaoni language):
जै गुरु-जै गुरु
माता पिता गुरु देवत
तब तुमरो नाम छू इजाऽऽऽऽऽऽ
यो रुमनी-झूमनी संध्या का बखत में॥

तै बखत का बीच में,
संध्या जो झुलि रै।
बरम का बरम लोक में, बिष्णु का बिष्णु लोक में,
राम की अजुध्या में, कृष्ण की द्वारिका में,
यो संध्या जो झुलि रै,
शम्भु का कैलाश में,
ऊँचा हिमाल, गैला पताल में,

Birtwai
During the Birtwai (बिर्त्वाई), the divine spirit being called upon is praised, and ballads related to his or her adventures and life are sung out loud.

The following text is an excerpt from the Birtwai of deity Bala Goria (in Kumaoni language):
गोरियाऽऽऽऽऽऽ दूदाधारी छै, कृष्ण अबतारी छै।
मामू को अगवानी छै, पंचनाम द्याप्तोंक भाँणिज छै,
तै बखत का बीच में गढ़ी चम्पावती में हालराई राज जो छन,
अहाऽऽऽऽ! रजा हालराई घर में संतान न्हेंतिन,
के धान करन कूनी राजा हालराई.......!

तै बखत में राजा हालराई सात ब्या करनी.....संताना नाम पर ढुँग लै पैद नि भै,
तै बखत में रजा हालराई अठुँ ब्या जो करनु कुनी,
राजैल गंगा नाम पर गध्यार नै हाली, द्याप्ता नाम पर ढुँग जो पुजिहाली,......
अहा क्वे राणि बटिक लै पुत्र पैद नि भै.......
राज कै पुत्रक शोकै रैगो

Ausan
During the Ausan (औसाण), the beating volume of the Hurka and other instruments is slowly increased. Here, the Dagariya goes into a state of a trance with frenzied movement.

The following text is an excerpt from the Ausan of deity Gangnath (in Kumaoni language):
एऽऽऽऽऽ राजौ- क रौताण छिये......!
एऽऽऽऽऽ डोटी गढ़ो क राज कुँवर जो छिये,
अहाऽऽऽऽऽ घटै की क्वेलारी, घटै की क्वेलारी।
आबा लागी गौछौ गांगू, डोटी की हुलारी॥

डोटी की हुलारी, म्यारा नाथा रे......माँगता फकीर।
रमता रंगीला जोगी, माँगता फकीर,
ओहोऽऽऽऽ माँगता फकीर......

Guru Aarti
All gods and demigods in the local pantheon of Kumaon are believed to be disciples of Guru Gorakhnath, who is remembered and asked for protection. This ritual is known as the Guru Aarti (गुरु आरती).

The following text is an excerpt of Guru Aarti of deity Gangnath (in Kumaoni language):
ए.......तै बखत का बीच में, हरिद्वार में बार बर्षक कुम्भ जो लागि रौ।
ए...... गांगू.....! हरिद्वार जै बेर गुरु की सेवा टहल जो करि दिनु कूँछे......!
अहा.... तै बखत का बीच में, कनखल में गुरु गोरखीनाथ जो भै रईं......!
ए...... गुरु कें सिराँ ढोक जो दिना, पयाँ लोट जो लिना.....!
ए...... तै बखत में गुरु की आरती जो करण फैगो, म्यरा ठाकुर बाबा.....!

अहा.... गुरु धें कुना, गुरु......, म्यारा कान फाड़ि दियो, मून-मूनि दियो,
भगैलि चादर दि दियौ, मैं कें बिद्या भार दी दियो,
मैं कें गुरुमुखी ज बणा दियो।
ओ... दो तारी को तार-ओ दो तारी को तार,
गुरु मैंकें दियो कूँछो, बिद्या को भार,
बिद्या को भार जोगी, माँगता फकीर,
रमता रंगीला जोगी, माँगता फकीर।

Khakh Raman
The ash known as Bibhuti (बिभूति) from Homa, the fire sacrifice made to the gods, is applied on the foreheads of those present. This is known as Khakh Raman (खाख रामाण).

Danik Vichar
Danik Vichar (दाणीक विचार) means thinking about the provider. Individuals present for Danik Vichar contemplate about God and the way he provides for them.

Ashirvad
Individuals present are ritually blessed by priests who pray for their prosperity. This is known as Ashirvad (आशीर्वाद).

Prasthan
In Prasthan (प्रस्थान), the gods are said to return to their heavenly abode at the stage of the Jagar.

Exponents
The exponents of the professional Jagar singing are highly respected. They have preserved these ballads of local gods through oral traditions, which are presently being recorded.

Examples of famous Jagar singers include the following:

 Kesh Ram Bhagat 
 Ganga Devi
 Uttam Das 
 Rameshwari Bhatt 
 Harda "Surdas"
 Joga Ram
 Kabutari Devi
 Manglesh Dangwal
 Mohan Singh
 Nain Nath Rawal
 Narayan Ram
 Pritam Bhartwan 
 Ram Singh
 Mohan Ram
 Basanti Bisht

Significance
Behind the performance of Jagar is the deep belief of the people of Uttarakhand in divine justice and the law of Karma, which states that bad deeds shall be visited upon the doer and that justice will finally be delivered by the gods.

Aside from their religious aspect, Jagar songs and singing styles are an integral part of the cultural heritage of Uttarakhand.

The ballads of the various gods sung during the Jagar are the part of the vast folk literature of the Kumaoni language and Garhwali language. These ballads are presently being collected for preservation.

See also

 Garhwal
 Garhwali people
 Garhwali language
 Kumaon
 Kumaoni people
 Kumaoni language

References

External links
 http://www.beatofindia.com/forms/jagar.htm

Culture of Uttarakhand
Garhwal division
Kumaon division